My Son Hunter is a film directed by Robert Davi and starring Laurence Fox, Gina Carano and John James. The film centers on Hunter Biden, the son of US president Joe Biden. Since 2019, Donald Trump and his allies have accused both Bidens of corruption. It is, according to The Guardians Catherine Shoard, the "debut fiction attempt" of documentarians Ann McElhinney and Phelim McAleer. The film is being distributed by American far-right news website Breitbart News, and was released on September 7, 2022.

Synopsis
According to the British online newspaper The Independent, the film centers on "allegations made by Trump allies" about Hunter Biden's foreign business deals. The producers stated that the film depicts the alleged "business dealings and lifestyle of Hunter Biden".

Cast
Laurence Fox as Hunter Biden
Gina Carano as Agent Hound, a secret service agent
John James as U.S. president Joe Biden
Emma Gojkovic as Grace "Kitty" Henderson
Franklin Ayodele as Tyrone 
Joe Nichols as Terence
Jay Lim as Ye Jianming
Ljubisa Milisic as Mykola Zlochevsky
Sasa Djordjevic as Viktor Yanukovych
Donald Borza II as Dinesh D'Souza
Dean Jones as Stephen Miller
Starr Jones as Louie Gohmert
Nenad Herakovic as Devon Archer

Development and filming 
Two conservative Irish filmmakers, Ann McElhinney and Phelim McAleer, are developing the film while attempting to raise its budget. When the film was first announced, it introduced its attempt to raise 2.5 million dollars via a private crowdfunding site. Currently, the project has raised over 2.5 million dollars from crowdfunding on its official site. Pre-production started as early as February 2021 according to star Gina Carano. The movie's crew includes Robert Davi as director, and Phelim McAleer & Ann McElhinney as producers.

Gina Carano, who will be playing a "world-weary" secret service agent in the film stated: "The script was instantly intriguing and side achingly hilarious to me, especially after being newly exposed to the political realm in 2020. Robert Davi is someone who reached out to me as soon as I was 'canceled' in Feb. 2021. I signed on in support of him and one of my favorite humans, Laurence Fox."

Production began in October 2021 in Serbia, and lasted for four weeks. During filming John James, who portrayed Joe Biden, had an off-set injury and was rushed to the hospital, though he continued filming after treatment saying that "the show must go on".

Reception 
 

The Spectator Australia called the movie a "socially dangerous, ego-damaging, and down-right delicious exposé of the Hunter Biden laptop scandal". Armond White of National Review said that the film "serves a muckraking, restorative function", and wrote: "Make no mistake, McAleer is polemical, but My Son Hunter doesn't condemn Hunter Biden so much as understand him and the nature of his offense — thus demonstrating the ultimate form of journalistic scruples."

Charles Bramesco of The Guardian wrote: "Writing critically about a film like My Son Hunter feels kind of like sending the kid making fart noises from the back of the class to detention", and described the film as a "fiction-laced retelling of the Hunter Biden laptop nothingburger" and a "dank bog of paranoia and conspiracy theorizing that is the sophomore directorial effort from Robert Davi." Naomi Fry of The New Yorker called the film "an amateurish, often batshit, if very occasionally vulgarly amusing satire-cum-thriller-cum-melodrama-cum-propaganda-organ, which switches between modes with the head-spinning unexpectedness of a Surrealist cutup."

References

External links

Crowdfunded films
Cultural depictions of Joe Biden
Films shot in Serbia
2020s English-language films
Hunter Biden
Breitbart News